Zhu Lin (born 1952) is a Chinese film actress. In 1978, Zhu graduated from Chinese Academy of Medical Sciences. Then she passed the examination of Beijing Film Academy. Her most famous role is the Queen of the Women's Kingdom in 1986 TV-series Journey To The West. In 1987, Zhu Lin won the Golden Eagle Award for Best Leading Actress for Triumph In The Midnight. She then became a popular leading actress in Chinese TV series.

Filmography
 Luo Tuo Cao (Camel Grass) 骆驼草 (1983) Liu Ying
 Journey to the West 西游记 (1986) (TV) The Queen of the Women's Kingdom
 Triumph In The Midnight 凯旋在子夜 (1987) (TV) Jiang Man
 Far Removed From The War Age 远离战争的年代 (1987) Wen Yan
 Chinese Family 421 中国家庭421 (2005) Shang Meifang
 Father And Mother (Seasons 1 and 2) 家有爹娘 第一部-第二部 (2006–2008) Liu Ying
 What On Earth Do You Want? 你到底要什么 (2009) Zhang Shouping

References

External links
Zhu Lin Fansite

1952 births
Living people
Chinese film actresses
Chinese television actresses
Beijing Film Academy alumni
Actresses from Beijing